Sholay: The Making of a Classic is a 2000 book written by Anupama Chopra, about the making of the Hindi film classic Sholay (1975). The book was released in 2000 by Penguin Books India. The book is based on the making of the film shooting. The book initially sold 10,000 copies, and won the 2001 National Film Award for Best Book on Cinema.

Content
The book is an inside look at the film's production, based on interviews with the director, stars, and crew members.

References

Indian non-fiction books
2000 non-fiction books
Books about individual films
Debut books
21st-century Indian books
Best Book on Cinema National Film Award winners
Sholay